The 1941 Xavier Musketeers football team was an American football team that represented Xavier University as an independent during the 1941 college football season. In its seventh season under head coach Clem Crowe, the team compiled a 9–1 record and outscored opponents by a total of 257 to 47. The team played its home games at Xavier Stadium in Cincinnati. Halfback Chet Mutryn starred on offense for Xavier.

Schedule

References

Xavier
Xavier Musketeers football seasons
Xavier Musketeers football